John Marchbanks Aitkenhead (21 May 1910 – 26 July 1998) was a Scottish teacher and co-founder with his wife Morag McKinnon Aitkenhead of Kilquhanity School.

Born in Glasgow, Aitkenhead attended Eglinton School and Ardrossan Academy before completing degrees in English and Education at the University of Glasgow. He worked as a secondary school teacher in Argyll, Glasgow and Ayrshire. After spending two terms as an observer at A. S. Neill's Summerhill School, but there being no vacancy on the staff, he decided to found his own free school in Scotland.

Kilquhanity School, near Castle Douglas, Kirkcudbrightshire, Scotland, opened in 1940, as a boarding and day school. With some difficulty, Aitkenhead gained recognition as a conscientious objector, enabling him to continue the work. The school operated continuously until closing in 1995.

References

Obituary: John Aitkenhead. The Independent, 21 August 1998

1910 births
1998 deaths
British conscientious objectors
British educational theorists